Nauruzovo (Nawrıź) is a rural locality (a selo) and the administrative centre of Nauruzovsky Selsoviet, Uchalinsky District, Bashkortostan, Russia. The population was 410 as of 2010. There are 12 streets.

Geography 
Nauruzovo is located 51 km southwest of Uchaly (the district's administrative centre) by road. Mishkino is the nearest rural locality.

References 

Rural localities in Uchalinsky District